Siu yeh, , is a late night meal in the food culture of southern China and Hong Kong. It is particularly associated with the cuisine of Hong Kong. It comes after dinner, and is similar to supper. Mealtime may start from about 9pm onwards until 4am, which would be early morning yum cha time. It can range anywhere from a snack to a full-fledged meal. For people working late night shifts, siu yeh is also associated with their post-midnight meals. The first usage of the term "siu yeh" appeared during the Tang Dynasty.

See also
Supper
Hong Kong cuisine
Daa Laang

References

Hong Kong cuisine